Robert Walden is an Australian Paralympic swimmer.  At the 1984 New York/Stoke Mandeville Games, he won four gold medals in the Men's 25 m Freestyle C6, Men's 50 m Freestyle C6, Men's 100 m Freestyle C6 and Men's 200 m Freestyle C6 events. He also participated without winning any medals at the 1988 Seoul Games.

References

Male Paralympic swimmers of Australia
Swimmers at the 1984 Summer Paralympics
Swimmers at the 1988 Summer Paralympics
Medalists at the 1984 Summer Paralympics
Paralympic gold medalists for Australia
Paralympic medalists in swimming
Australian male freestyle swimmers
Year of birth missing (living people)
Living people